The James Cardinal Gibbons Medal is named in honor James Cardinal Gibbons, the founder and first chancellor of The Catholic University of America.  It is intended to honor any person who, in the opinion of the university's Alumni Association's board of governors, has rendered distinguished and meritorious service to the Roman Catholic Church, the United States of America, or The Catholic University of America.

Winners include Bishop Fulton J. Sheen, Senator John F. Kennedy, Speaker John W. McCormack, Sargent Shriver, Nancy Reagan, Supreme Court Justice Antonin Scalia, Sister Helen Prejean, and Ronan Tynan.

The Gibbons Medal is conferred by the university president on behalf of the CUA Alumni Association during the alumni awards ceremony.  John F. Kennedy was awarded the medal while still a senator, upon the nomination of Eddie Pryzbyla, a future winner himself.

Winners

References

Catholic ecclesiastical decorations
Catholic University of America
Awards established in 1949
1949 establishments in Washington, D.C.